= Lal Paltan =

Bengali weekly language paper

Lal Paltan (Bengali: লাল পল্টন) ('Red Army') was a Bengali language weekly published in Bengal, India. The first edition appeared in October 1928. The editor of the paper was Bimal Ganguly, publicity officer of the Lilloah E.I.R. Union. The paper carried the hammer and sickle on its first page. British colonial authorities deemed the publication as communist.
